Krasny Khutor is a rural locality (a selo) in Belgorodsky District, Belgorod Oblast, Russia. The population was 554 as of 2010. There are 5 streets.

Geography 
Krasny Khutor is located 30 km southwest of Maysky (the district's administrative centre) by road. Novaya Naumovka is the nearest rural locality.

References 

Rural localities in Belgorodsky District
Belgorodsky Uyezd